See You at the Pole is an annual gathering of thousands of Christian students at school flag poles, churches, and the Internet for the purposes of worship and prayer. It is now an international event; in 2005, over two million students in the U.S. participated, as well as students in Canada, Cote d'Ivoire, the Democratic Republic of the Congo, Ecuador, Ghana, Guam, Hong Kong, Indonesia, Japan, Kenya, South Korea, Malaysia, Nigeria, Norway, Peru, Portugal, Scotland, Singapore and South Africa.

Legal status in the United States

Background
In the U.S., school-sponsored prayers in public schools have been found unconstitutional, but prayers organized by students themselves are allowed and protected by free speech rights.
The organization advocating and guiding student participation in SYATP events insists that they be exclusively student-initiated and led without official endorsement or interference, according to rights affirmed by the Tinker v. Des Moines Independent Community School District decision of the U.S. Supreme Court—as well as a 1995 Clinton administration assignment of the President's Secretary of Education for legalization of particular school religious activities as long as they passed constitutional guidelines. The American Civil Liberties Union also approves of student-led SYATP events held before or after school, provided the school neither encourages nor discourages participation.

Pastors, teachers, and other adults are often involved, and critics say that SYATP events often are only nominally student-led.

Cases
In 2006, school officials at South Floyd High School in Floyd County, Kentucky tried to deny students permission for the flag pole rally, but attorneys from the Rutherford Institute successfully argued that the rally was protected by free speech rights. "It's important that students, teachers and others know about their right to participate in See You at the Pole events—a right affirmed by the U.S. Supreme Court," said John W. Whitehead, president of the Rutherford Institute, in a released statement. "The rallies are part of a long tradition of free and equal participation in expressive activities guaranteed by our Constitution."

In the case of Doe v. Wilson County School System (M.D. Tenn. 2006, pending), the ACLU alleged that a parent group promoted the SYATP event and a National Day of Prayer with support from the school. Support for SYATP was one of several religious endorsements alleged in the case, along with sing-along prayers, hymns, and a Nativity play.

See You at the Pole Rallies (often called Saw You at the Pole or See You after the Pole)
After SYATP rallies are events which usually take place the evening of SYATP. These rallies are sponsored by local churches or local youth ministry networks and generally include one or more of the following elements:  Contemporary Christian Music concert, worship, testimonies, drama, and/or a speaker.

References

External links
Official web site

Christian events
September observances
Recurring events established in 1990